Cheswick may refer to:

Places
Cheswick, Gloucestershire, England
Cheswick, Northumberland, England
Cheswick, Pennsylvania, United States

People
William Cheswick, computer security and networking researcher
Charles Cheswick, a fictional character in the novel One Flew Over the Cuckoo's Nest

See also
 Chiswick (disambiguation)

English toponymic surnames